Psychrophrynella chirihampatu is a species of frogs in the family Strabomantidae. It is endemic to Peru and known only from its type locality, the Japumato Valley in the Peruvian Andes of the Cusco. The common name Japumayo Andes frog has been coined for this species.

Etymology
The specific name chirihampatu is a combination of Quechua words meaning "cold toad" (chiri hamp'atu). The genus name Psychrophrynella has the same meaning.

Description
Males measure  and females  in snout–vent length. Skin on the dorsum is finely shagreen, with some small warts forming linear ridges at mid dorsum. Skin on the venter is smooth. The tympanic membrane is not differentiated and the tympanic annulus is barely visible below skin. The snout short is bluntly rounded. Neither fingers nor toes have lateral fringes or webbing. The dorsal color varies considerably between individuals: the dorsum is tan to brown and gray, with dark brown markings; some individuals have a yellow or orange mid-dorsal line. An inter-orbital bar is present. The chest, venter and ventral parts of the arms and legs are yellow with brown flecks. The throat and palmar and plantar surfaces brown or reddish-brown. Males have vocal sac and vocal slits but no nuptial pads.

Reproduction
Males have been observed calling during the day. The advertisement call is composed of multiple notes; the call of the holotype lasted 1–4.5 seconds and consisted of 10–68 single-pulsed notes. Female fecundity is 7–12 eggs.

Habitat and conservation
Psychrophrynella chirihampatu has been found in areas of disturbed montane forest vegetation, often along the forest edges bordering landslides and other open areas.

This species has been assessed as of least concern by the International Union for Conservation of Nature (IUCN). The surveyed populations are relatively large, and no direct threats are currently known—the species might actually benefit from some habitat disturbance. The known range is within a protected area.

References

chirihampatu
Amphibians of the Andes
Amphibians of Peru
Endemic fauna of Peru
Amphibians described in 2016